Valentino Rossi: The Game is a motorcycle racing video game developed and published by Milestone S.r.l. The game was released for Microsoft Windows,MacOS, PlayStation 4, and Xbox One on 16 June 2016. It is the official video game of the 2016 MotoGP World Championship season. The game is endorsed by Italian former professional motorcycle racer Valentino Rossi.

Features
The 2016 official MotoGP video game incorporates details of the racer Valentino Rossi, the 2016 MotoGP World Championship season, and several features from the previous game. The player is able to participate in the official MotoGP World Championship, focusing on Rossi's career from its beginnings to the present day. In the game, the player can take control of a rally car and race on various tracks such as the Monza Rally. The player can participate in Flat Track races and explore Valentino Rossi's Ranch.

Reception

The game scored a 75/100 review on the aggregator Metacritic.

References

External links 
 MotoGP site

2016 video games
Video games developed in Italy
Grand Prix motorcycle racing video games
Racing video games
Grand Prix motorcycle racing
PlayStation 3 games
PlayStation 4 games
Windows games
Xbox 360 games
Xbox One games
Multiplayer and single-player video games
Split-screen multiplayer games
Multiplayer online games
Video games set in Argentina
Video games set in Australia
Video games set in Austria
Video games set in the Czech Republic
Video games set in England
Video games set in France
Video games set in Germany
Video games set in Italy
Video games set in Japan
Video games set in Malaysia
Video games set in the Netherlands
Video games set in Portugal
Video games set in Qatar
Video games set in South Africa
Video games set in Spain
Video games set in Texas
Video games with downloadable content
Milestone srl games
Video games based on real people
Rossi
Rossi
Valentino Rossi